is a Japanese table tennis player.

Achievements
Women's singles

 
Women's doubles

References

1996 births
Japanese female table tennis players
Living people
Sportspeople from Osaka
Nissay Red Elf players